The College of Charleston Cougars women's basketball team is an NCAA Division I college basketball team competing in the Colonial Athletic Association. Home games are played at TD Arena, located on College of Charleston's campus in Charleston, South Carolina. The Cougars are coached by Robin Harmony, completing her second season.

History
The College of Charleston women Maroons were first formed in 1919. Pierrine Smith Byrd, who would become the College's first female graduate in 1922, was the team's first captain. They joined the Trans America Athletic Conference (now known as the ASUN Conference) in 1991. They joined the Southern Conference in 1998. They joined the CAA in 2013. They have made the Women's Basketball Invitational in 2010, 2013, and 2014. they have made the Semifinals in the former and the latter year. As of the end of the 2015–16 season, the Cougars have an all-time record of 652–584.

Postseason

AIAW College Division/Division II
The Cougars made three appearances in the AIAW National Division II Basketball Tournament, with a combined record of 9–3.

References

External links